Timothy Roberts is a British organist, harpsichordist and conductor. Leading his own ensemble, Invocation, Roberts made a series of pioneering recordings of Georgian era vocal music for Hyperion Records. He has also directed His Majesty's Consort of Voices and His Majestys Sagbutts & Cornetts.

Selected discography
Thomas Moore's Irish Melodies with Invocation
The Romantic Muse with Invocation
Andrea Gabrieli: Missa Pater peccavi with His Majesty's Consort of Voices, His Majesty's Sagbutts & Cornetts

References

Living people
21st-century British conductors (music)
Year of birth missing (living people)